Thomas Brandi (born July 9, 1966) is an American professional wrestler. He is best known for his appearances in the World Wrestling Federation from 1996 to 1998 under the ring name Salvatore Sincere. Brandi is also known for his appearances with the American Wrestling Federation, World Championship Wrestling and Extreme Championship Wrestling as Johnny Gunn.

Professional wrestling career

Early career (1985–1992)
Brandi debuted in 1985 after being trained by indy wrestler King Kaluha. His first notoriety came in International World Class Championship Wrestling where he won the IWCCW Television Championship as "Chippendale" Tom Brandi a gimmick similar to the one used by The Fantastics and The Fabulous Ones in the 1980s. In World Championship Wrestling (WCW), Brandi went by Johnny Gunn. He achieved some of the most notable moments in his career while teaming with Tom Zenk. At Halloween Havoc 1992, Brandi partnered with Shane Douglas and Tom Zenk to defeat Bobby Eaton, Arn Anderson, and Michael Hayes.

American Wrestling Federation (1994)
In 1994, he competed for the short lived American Wrestling Federation on the TV series Warriors of Wrestling where he used the name "Johnny Gunn" and renewed his chippendales gimmick where he was a fan favorite.  Brandi also teamed with Jim Powers while in the AWF.

Extreme Championship Wrestling and independent circuit
Brandi later joined Extreme Championship Wrestling and teamed with Tommy Dreamer to capture the ECW Tag Team Championships. They captured the titles from Johnny Hotbody and Tony Stetson in only nine seconds. Less than a month later, the pair would lose the titles to The Tazmaniac (later Tazz) and Kevin Sullivan. Having suffered an injury, Gunn was replaced with Shane Douglas for a night, who turned on Dreamer to cost them the tag belts.

United States Wrestling Federation
In 1995, Brandi won the USWF Championship under the name Johnny Gunn. After losing the championship to his former trainer, King Kaluha, Brandi won the USWF Tag Team Championship from Damage Inc.

World Wrestling Federation (1996–1998)
He then went to the WWF, debuting in July 1996 as "Salvatore Sincere," a villainous stereotypical Bronx Italian/Mafioso character clad in pink and white who falsely claimed to be sincere and to "love" everyone. He appeared at the 1996 Survivor Series and In Your House: It's Time, where he wrestled in dark matches. He also worked matches with some of the WWF's top names at the time, including Shawn Michaels, The Undertaker, and Dwayne Johnson (billed as "Rocky Maivia" during his debut match in the WWF with Salvatore). He briefly feuded with Marc Mero over valet Sable in 1997. During this storyline, Brandi began wrestling under his given name after Mero called him a jobber and said that he was "Tom Brandi", not Salvatore Sincere. Sincere later would go on to win a match against Mero by countout. After going by his real name, he participated in the 1998 Royal Rumble match, lasting a matter of seconds before being eliminated by Cactus Jack and Terry Funk. He lost to Jeff Jarrett in his last televised match on March 17, 1998 episode of Monday Night Raw. Brandi left the WWF that April.

Return to the independent circuit (1998–present)
Since leaving the WWF, Brandi has wrestled on the independent circuit under both the Brandi and Sincere names, and sometimes wrestles or does autograph signings under a mask as The Patriot, although without the permission of the original Patriot, Del Wilkes.

Championships and accomplishments
Americas Wrestling Federation (Puerto Rico)
AWF International Heavyweight Championship (1 time)
AWF World Junior Heavyweight Championship (1 time)
AWF World Tag Team Championship (1 time) - with Ray González
Big Time Wrestling
BTW Heavyweight Championship (1 time)
Eastern Championship Wrestling
ECW Tag Team Championship (1 time) – with Tommy Dreamer
Devastation Wrestling Federation
DWF Heavyweight Championship (1 time)
Independent Pro Wrestling
IPW Americas Championship (1 time)
Independent Professional Wrestling Alliance
IPWA Heavyweight Championship (4 times)
Independent Superstars of Pro Wrestling
ISPW Tag Team Championship (1 time) - with The Winner's Club (King Kaluha & Michael Mars)
Independent Wrestling Alliance
IWA Heavyweight Championship (1 time)
Independent Wrestling Association Mid-South
IWA Mid-South Heavyweight Championship (1 time)
International Pro Wrestling
IPW Heavyweight Championship (1 time)
International World Class Championship Wrestling
IWCCW Tag Team Championship (1 time) – with King Mike Kaluah
IWCCW Television Championship (1 time)
International Wrestling Association
IWA United States Heavyweight Championship (1 time)
National Championship Wrestling
NCW United States Heavyweight Championship (1 time)
NCW Tag Team Championship (1 time) - with Jimmy Snuka
NWA 2000
NWA National Heavyweight Championship (1 time)
Pro-Wrestling WORLD-1/Premier Wrestling Federation
PWF Universal Tag Team Championship (1 time) – with Mike Kehner
Pro Wrestling Illustrated
PWI ranked him #478 of the 500 best singles wrestlers during the "PWI Years" in 2003
Steel City Wrestling
SCW Heavyweight Championship (1 time)
SCW Television Championship (1 time)
United States Championship Wrestling
USCW Pacific Heavyweight Championship (1 time)
United States Wrestling Federation
USWF Heavyweight Championship (1 time)
USWF Tag Team Championship (1 time) – with Steve Corino
Virginia Wrestling Association
VWA American Championship (1 time)
Wrestling Independent Network
WIN North American Championship (1 time)
World Wrestling Council
WWC Television Championship (1 time)
Xtreme Maximum Championship Wrestling
XMCW Legends And Superstars Championship (1 time)

References

External links

1966 births
20th-century professional wrestlers
21st-century professional wrestlers
American male professional wrestlers
American professional wrestlers of Italian descent
ECW World Tag Team Champions
Living people
NWA National Heavyweight Champions
People from Philadelphia
Professional wrestlers from Pennsylvania
WWC Television Champions